The 2018–19 UEFA Youth League UEFA Champions League Path (group stage) began on 18 September and concluded on 12 December 2018. A total of 32 teams competed in group stage of the UEFA Champions League Path to decide 16 of the 24 places in the knockout phase (play-offs and the round of 16 onwards) of the 2018–19 UEFA Youth League.

Draw

The youth teams of the 32 clubs which qualify for the 2018–19 UEFA Champions League group stage enter the UEFA Champions League Path. If there is a vacancy (youth teams not entering), it is filled by a team defined by UEFA.

For the UEFA Champions League Path, the 32 teams were drawn into eight groups of four. There was no separate draw held, with the group compositions identical to the draw for the 2018–19 UEFA Champions League group stage, which was held on 30 August 2018, 18:00 CEST, at the Grimaldi Forum in Monaco.

Format

In each group, teams play against each other home-and-away in a round-robin format. The eight group winners advance to the round of 16, while the eight runners-up advance to the play-offs, where they were joined by the eight second round winners from the Domestic Champions Path.

Tiebreakers

Teams are ranked according to points (3 points for a win, 1 point for a draw, 0 points for a loss), and if tied on points, the following tiebreaking criteria are applied, in the order given, to determine the rankings (Regulations Articles 14.03):
Points in head-to-head matches among tied teams;
Goal difference in head-to-head matches among tied teams;
Goals scored in head-to-head matches among tied teams;
Away goals scored in head-to-head matches among tied teams;
If more than two teams are tied, and after applying all head-to-head criteria above, a subset of teams are still tied, all head-to-head criteria above are reapplied exclusively to this subset of teams;
Goal difference in all group matches;
Goals scored in all group matches;
Away goals scored in all group matches;
Wins in all group matches;
Away wins in all group matches;
Disciplinary points (red card = 3 points, yellow card = 1 point, expulsion for two yellow cards in one match = 3 points);
Drawing of lots.

Groups

The matchdays are 18–19 September, 2–3 October, 23–24 October, 6–7 November, 27–28 November, and 11–12 December 2018.

Times are CET/CEST, as listed by UEFA (local times, if different, are in parentheses).

Group A

Group B

Group C

Group D

Group E

Group F

Group G

Group H

Notes

References

External links

1
September 2018 sports events in Europe
October 2018 sports events in Europe
November 2018 sports events in Europe
December 2018 sports events in Europe